Parium (or Parion) was a Greek city of Adrasteia in Mysia on the Hellespont. Its bishopric was a suffragan of Cyzicus, the metropolitan see of the Roman province of Hellespontus.

History
Founded in 709 B.C., the ancient city of Parion is located in the village of Kemer in the township of Biga in Çanakkale province of Turkey, currently. A major coastal city with two harbors in the Roman period, Parium had intensive relations with Thrace and Anatolia throughout history. This was the main customs station through which all Istanbul-bound goods from Greece and the Aegean had to pass.

According to Strabo, it was a colony of Milesians, Erythraeans, and Parians.

It belonged at one point to the Achaemenid Empire. Herophantus was a tyrant of Parion under Darius I.

It then belonged to the Delian League.  In the Hellenistic period it came under the domain of Lysimachus, and subsequently the Attalid dynasty.  In Roman times, it was a colonia, within the province of Asia; after that province was divided in the 4th century, it was in the province of Hellespontus.  The ancient coinage of Parium is quite abundant, attesting to its great output and advanced mint (in Hellenistic times, the city's badge shown on coins was the Gorgoneion).

Christian history
The Acts of the martyr St. Onesiphorus prove that there was a Christian community there before 180. Other saints worthy of mention are: St. Menignus, martyred under Decius and venerated on 22 November; St. Theogenes, bishop and martyr, whose feast is observed on 3 January; Basil the Confessor, bishop and martyr in the eighth century, venerated on 12 April.

Le Quien (Oriens christianus I, 787–90) mentions 14 bishops, the last of whom lived in the middle of the fourteenth century. An anonymous Latin bishop is mentioned in 1209 by Innocent III (Le Quien, op. cit., III, 945) and a titular bishop in 1410 by Eubel (Hierarchia Catholica medii ævi, I, 410).

At first a suffragan of the Archbishopric, Parium became an autocephalous archdiocese as early as 640 (Heinrich Gelzer, Ungedruckte ... Texte, 535) and remained so till the end of the 13th century. Then the Emperor Andronicus II Palaeologus made it a metropolis under the title of Pegon kai Pariou.

In 1354 the residential see of Pegae and Parium (the Latin forms of both names) were suppressed, the incumbent metropolitan receiving in exchange the See of Sozopolis in Thrace (Miklosich and Müller, "Acta patriarchatus Constantinopolitani", I, 109, 111, 132, 300, 330). This was the end of the residential see.

The see is included in the Catholic Church's list of titular sees.

The ruins of Parium were under Ottoman rule at the Greek village of Kamares (the vaults), on the small cape Tersana-Bournou in the caza and sandjak of Bigha.

Archaeology 

Archaeologists have been carrying out excavations at the ancient site since 2005. Sarcophagi and graves, as well as ancient artifacts were found in the area. In 2017, ancient toys from the Hellenistic Period have been discovered inside tombs belonging to children, believed to be buried with the aim to accompany the children on their journey to the afterlife. Also, a baby bottle was discovered around the same necropolis.

Notable people 

 Herophantos of Parion, tyrant of Parion.

See also 
 List of ancient Greek cities

Notes

Bibliography
 P. Frisch (ed.), Die Inschriften von Parion (Bonn, 1983) (Inschriften griechischer Städte aus Kleinasien 25).

External links

Populated places established in the 8th century BC
Catholic titular sees in Asia
Populated places in ancient Mysia
Defunct dioceses of the Ecumenical Patriarchate of Constantinople
Ancient Greek archaeological sites in Turkey
Greek city-states
Parian colonies
Milesian colonies
Greek colonies on the Black Sea coast
Coloniae (Roman)